This list of the oldest newspapers sorts the newspapers of the world by the date of their first publication. The earliest newspapers date to 17th century Europe when printed periodicals began rapidly to replace the practice of hand-writing newssheets. The emergence of the new media branch has to be seen in close connection with the simultaneous spread of the printing press from which the publishing press derives its name. The oldest living newspaper in the world, and with the same title, is the Gazzetta di Mantova, regularly published in Mantua (Italy) since 1664.

Definition 
Newspapers − apart from being printed − are typically expected to meet four criteria:
Publicity: Its contents are reasonably accessible to the public.
Periodicity: It is published at regular intervals.
Currentness: Its information is up to date.
Universality: It covers a range of topics.

By region

Europe

Americas

Africa
The French established the first newspaper in Africa in Mauritius in 1773.

South Asia
The first recorded attempt to found a newspaper in South Asia was by William Bolts, a Dutchman in the employ of the British East India Company in September 1768 in Calcutta. The Company deported Bolts back to Europe before he could begin his newspaper.

Oceania

East Asia

See also

Lists of newspapers
List of early-modern journals
Kaiyuan Za Bao, has been described as the earliest newspaper to be published

Notes

References

Citations

Sources

External links
 Timeline of the Newspaper Industry: From the Acta Diurna to the Digital Processes Inventors.about.com

Lists of newspapers
Newspapers
History of newspapers
History of printing
Newspapers
Newspapers